Longships were a type of specialised Scandinavian warships that have a long history in Scandinavia, with their existence being archaeologically proven and documented from at least the fourth century BC. Originally invented and used by the Norsemen (commonly known as the Vikings) for commerce, exploration, and warfare during the Viking Age, many of the longship's characteristics were adopted by other cultures, like Anglo-Saxons, and continued to influence shipbuilding for centuries.

The longship's design evolved over many centuries, and continued up until the sixth century with clinker-built ships like Nydam. The longship appeared in its complete form between the ninth and 13th centuries. The character and appearance of these ships have been reflected in Scandinavian boatbuilding traditions to the present day. The particular skills and methods employed in making longships are still used worldwide, often with modern adaptations. They were all made out of wood, with cloth sails (woven wool), and had several details and carvings on the hull.

Characteristics
The longships were characterized as graceful, long, narrow, and light, with a shallow-draft hull designed for speed. The ship's shallow draft allowed navigation in waters only one meter deep and permitted arbitrary beach landings, while its light weight enabled it to be carried over portages or used bottom-up for shelter in camps. Longships were also double-ended, the symmetrical bow and stern allowing the ship to reverse direction quickly without a turn around; this trait proved particularly useful at northern latitudes, where icebergs and sea ice posed hazards to navigation. Longships were fitted with oars along almost the entire length of the boat itself. Later versions had a rectangular sail on a single mast, which was used to replace or augment the effort of the rowers, particularly during long journeys. One longship, in particular, can be seen in Oslo, Norway in The Viking Ship museum.

History
The Viking longships were powerful naval weapons in their time and were highly valued possessions. Archaeological finds show that the Viking ships were not standardized. Ships varied from designer to designer and place to place and often had regional characteristics. For example, the choice of material was mostly dictated by the regional forests, such as pine from Norway and Sweden, and oak from Denmark. Moreover, each Viking longship had particular features adjusted to the natural conditions under which it was sailed.

They were often communally owned by coastal farmers or commissioned by kings in times of conflict, to quickly assemble a large and powerful naval force. While longships were used by the Norse in warfare, they were mostly used as troop transports, not warships. In the tenth century, longships would sometimes be tied together in offshore battles to form a steady platform for infantry warfare. During the ninth-century peak of the Viking expansion, large fleets set out to attack the degrading Frankish empire by attacking navigable rivers such as the Seine. Rouen was sacked in 841, the year after the death of Louis the Pious, a son of Charlemagne. Quentovic, near modern Étaples, was attacked in 842 and 600 Danish ships attacked Hamburg in 845. In the same year, 129 ships returned to attack the Seine. They were called "dragon ships" by enemies such as the English because they had a dragon-shaped bow. The Norse had a strong sense of naval architecture, and during the early medieval period, they were advanced for their time.

Types of longships
Longships can be classified into a number of different types, depending on size, construction details, and prestige. The most common way to classify longships is by the number of rowing positions on board.

Karvi
The Karvi (or Karve) is the smallest vessel that is considered a longship. According to the tenth-century Gulating Law, a ship with 13 rowing benches is the smallest ship suitable for military use. A ship with 6 to 16 benches would be classified as a Karvi. These ships were considered to be "general purpose" ships, mainly used for fishing and trade, but occasionally commissioned for military use. While most longships held a length to width ratio of 7:1, the Karvi ships were closer to 9:2. 
The Gokstad Ship is a famous Karvi ship, built around the end of the ninth century, excavated in 1880 by Nicolay Nicolaysen.

Snekkja

The  (or snekke) was typically the smallest longship used in warfare and was classified as a ship with at least 20 rowing benches. It would carry a crew of around 41 men (40 oarsmen and one cox).

Snekkjas was one of the most common types of ships. According to Viking lore, Canute the Great used 1,200 in Norway in 1028.

The Norwegian snekkjas, designed for deep fjords and Atlantic weather, typically had more draught than the Danish ships designed for low coasts and beaches. Snekkjas were so light that they had no need of portsthey could simply be beached, and even carried across a portage.

The snekkjas continued to evolve after the end of the Viking age, with later Norwegian examples becoming larger and heavier than Viking age ships. A modern version is still being used in Scandinavia, and is now called snipa in Swedish and snekke in Norwegian.

Skeid

Skeid (skeið), meaning 'slider' (referring to a sley, a weavers reed, or to a sheath that a knife slides into) and probably connoting 'speeder' (referring to a running race) (Zoega, Old Icelandic Dictionary). These ships were larger warships, consisting of more than 30 rowing benches. Ships of this classification are some of the largest (see Busse) longships ever discovered. A group of these ships were discovered by Danish archaeologists in Roskilde during development in the harbour-area in 1962 and 1996–97. The ship discovered in 1962, Skuldelev 2 is an oak-built Skeid longship. It is believed to have been built in the Dublin area around 1042. They had around 30 rowing chairs. In 1996–97 archaeologists discovered the remains of another ship in the harbour. Skuldelev 2 was replicated as Seastallion from Glendalough at the Viking Ship Museum in Roskilde and launched in 2004. It was built from scratch by experts, using original Viking and experimental archaeological methods.

Drakkar

Drakkar, or dreki 'dragon', are the type of ship, of thirty rowing benches and upwards that are only known from historical sources, such as the 13th-century Göngu-Hrólfs saga. Here, the ships are described as most unusual, elegant, ornately decorated, and used by those who went raiding and plundering. These ships were likely skeids that differed only in the carvings of menacing beasts, such as dragons and snakes, carried on the prow of the ship.

The earliest mentioned drakkar was the ship of unstated size owned by Harald Fairhair in the tenth century. The first drakkar ship whose size was mentioned in the source was Olav Tryggvason's thirty-room Tranin, built at Nidaros circa 995. By far the most famous in this period was his later ship the Ormrinn Langi ('Long Serpent') of thirty-four rooms, built over the winter of 999 to 1000. No true dragon ship, as described in the sagas, has been found by archaeological excavation.

The city seal of Bergen, Norway, created in 1299, depicts a ship with a dragon's head at either end, which might be intended to represent a drakkar ship.

Construction
The first longships can trace their origin back to between 500 and 300 BC, when the Danish Hjortspring boat was built. It was fastened with cord, not nailed, and paddled, not rowed. The rounded sections gave maximum displacement for the lowest wetted surface area, similar to a modern narrow rowing skiff, so were very fast but had little carrying capacity. The shape suggests mainly river use. Unlike later boats, it had a low bow and stern. A distinctive feature is the two-prong cutaway bow section.

The earliest rowed true longship that has been found is the Nydam ship, built in Denmark around 350 AD. It also had very rounded underwater sections but had more pronounced flare in the topsides, giving it more stability as well as keeping more water out of the boat at speed or in waves. It had no sail. It was of lapstrake construction fastened with iron nails. The bow and stern had slight elevation. The keel was a flattened plank about twice as thick as a normal strake plank but still not strong enough to withstand the downwards thrust of a mast.

The Sutton Hoo longship, sometimes referred to as the ghost ship of the Wulflings, is about  maximum beam and built about 625 AD. It is associated with the Saxons. The ship was crushed by the weight of soil when buried but most details have been reconstructed. The ship was similar in hull section to the Nydam ship with flared topsides. Compared to later longships, the oak planks are wide—about  including laps, with less taper at bow and stern. Each frame tapers from the turn of the bilge to the inwale. This suggests that knees were used to brace the upper two or three topside planks but have rotted away. The hull had a distinctive leaf shape with the bow sections much narrower than the stern quarters. There were nine wide planks per side. The ship had a light keel plank but pronounced stem and stern deadwood. The reconstruction suggests the stern was much lower than the bow. It had a steering oar to starboard braced by an extra frame. Between each futtock the planks were lapped in normal clinker style and fastened with six iron rivets per plank. There is no evidence of a mast, sail, or strengthening of the keel amidships but a half-sized replica, the Soe Wylfing, sailed very well with a modest sail area.

Sails started to be used from possibly the eighth century. The earliest had either plaited or chequered pattern, with narrow strips sewn together.

In the late eighth century, the Kvalsund ship was built. It is the first with a true keel. Its cross sectional shape was flatter on the bottom with less flare to the topsides. This shape is far more stable and able to handle rougher seas. It had the high prow of the later longships. After several centuries of evolution, the fully developed longship emerged some time in the middle of the ninth century. Its long, graceful, menacing head figure carved in the stern, such as the Oseburg ship, echoed the designs of its predecessors. The mast was now square in section and located toward the middle of the ship, and could be lowered and raised. The hull's sides were fastened together to allow it to flex with the waves, combining lightness and ease of handling on land. The ships were large enough to carry cargo and passengers on long ocean voyages, but still maintained speed and agility, making the longship a versatile warship and cargo carrier.

Keel, stems and hull

The Viking shipbuilders had no written diagrams or standard written design plan. The shipbuilder pictured the longship before its construction, based on previous builds, and the ship was then built from the keel up. The keel and stems were made first. The shape of the stem was based on segments of circles of varying sizes. The keel was an inverted T shape to accept the garboard planks. In the longships the keel was made up of several sections spliced together and fastened with treenails. The next step was building the strakes—the lines of planks joined endwise from stem to stern. Nearly all longships were clinker (also known as lapstrake) built, meaning that each hull plank overlapped the next. The planks were radially hewn so that the grain is approximately at right angles to the surface of the plank. This provides maximum strength, an even bend and an even rate of expansion and contraction in water. This is called in modern terms quartersawn timber, and has the least natural shrinkage of any cut section of wood. This was also the area subject to collisions. Each overlap was stuffed with wool or animal hair or sometimes hemp soaked in pine tar to ensure water tightness. There is considerable twist and bend in the end planks. This was achieved by use of both thinner (by 50%) and narrower planks. In more sophisticated builds, forward planks were cut from natural curved trees called reaction wood. Planks were installed unseasoned or wet. Partly worked stems and sterns have been located in bogs. It has been suggested that they were stored there over winter to stop the wood from drying and cracking. The moisture in wet planks allowed the builder to force the planks into a more acute bend, if need be; once dry it would stay in the forced position. At the bow and the stern builders were able to create hollow sections, or compound bends, at the waterline, making the entry point very fine. In less sophisticated ships short and nearly straight planks were used at the bow and stern. Where long timber was not available or the ship was very long, the planks were butt-joined, although overlapping scarf joints fixed with nails were also used.

As the planks reached the desired height, the interior frame (futtocks) and cross beams were added. Frames were placed close together, which is an enduring feature of thin planked ships, still used today on some lightweight wooden racing craft such as those designed by Bruce Farr. Part of the reason for this spacing was to achieve the correct distance between rowing stations and to create space for the chests used by Norse sailors as thwarts (seats). The bottom futtocks next to the keel were made from natural L-shaped crooks. The upper futtocks were usually not attached to the lower futtocks to allow some hull twist. The parts were held together with iron rivets, hammered in from the outside of the hull and fastened from the inside with a rove (washers). The surplus rivet was then cut off. In later ships spruce stringers were fastened lengthwise to the futtocks roughly parallel to the keel. Longships had about five rivets for each yard of plank. In many early ships treenails (trenails, trunnels) were used to fasten large timbers. Some treenails have been found with traces of linseed oil suggesting that treenails were soaked before the pegs were inserted. When dried the oil would act as a semi-waterproof weak filler/glue.

The longship's narrow deep keel provided strength beneath the waterline. A typical size keel of a longer ship was  amidships, tapering in width at the bow and stern. Sometimes there was a false outer keel to take the wear while being dragged up a beach. These large timbers were shaped with both adze and broadaxe. At the bow the cut water was especially strong, as longboats sailed in ice strewn water in spring. The greater beam provided more moment of leverage by placing the crew or any other mobile weight on the windward side. Higher topsides were supported with knees with the long axis fastened to the top of the crossbeams. The hull was waterproofed with animal hair, wool, hemp or moss drenched in pine tar. The ships would be tarred in the autumn and then left in a boathouse over the winter to allow time for the tar to dry. Evidence of small scale domestic tar production dates from between 100 AD and 400 AD. Larger industrial scale tar pits, estimated to be capable of producing up to 300 litres of tar in a single firing have been dated to between 680 AD and 900 AD.

The oars did not use rowlocks or thole pins but holes cut below the gunwale line. To keep seawater out, these oar holes were sealed with wooden disks from the inside, when the oars were not in use. The holes were also used for belaying mooring lines and sail sheets.

Timber
Analysis of timber samples from Viking long boats shows that a variety of timbers were used, but there was strong preference for oak, a tree associated with Thor in Viking mythology. Oak is a heavy, durable timber that can be easily worked by adze and axe when green (wet/unseasoned). Generally large and prestigious ships were made from oak. Other timber used were ash, elm, pine, spruce and larch. Spruce is light and seems to have been more common in later designs for internal hull battens (stringers). Although it is used for spars in modern times there is as yet no evidence the Vikings used spruce for masts. All timber was used unseasoned. The bark was removed by a bark spade. This consisted of a  wooden handle with a T crossbar at the upper end, fitted with a broad chisel-like cutting edge of iron. It appears that in cold winters wood work stopped and partly completed timber work was buried in mud to prevent it drying out. Timber was worked with iron adzes and axes. Most of the smoothing was done with a side axe. Other tools used in woodwork were hammers, wedges, drawknives, planes and saws. Iron saws were probably very rare. The Domesday Book in England (1086 AD) records only 13 saws. Possibly these were pit saws and it is uncertain if they were used in longship construction.

Sail and mast
Even though no longship sail has been found, accounts and depictions verify that longships had square sails. Unlike in knarrs, a longship sail was not stitched.

The mast was supported by a large wooden maststep called a kerling ("old woman" in Old Norse) that was semicircular in shape. It usually heavily tapered into a joint with the internal keelson, although keelsons were by no means universal. The kerling lay across two strong frames that ran width-wise above the keel in the centre of the boat. The kerling also had a companion: the "mast fish," a wooden timber above the kerling just below deck height that provided extra help in keeping the mast erect. This acted as a mechanism to catch and secure the mast before the stays were secured. It was an early form of mast partner but was aligned fore and aft. In later longships there is no mast fish-the mast partner is an athwartwise beam similar to more modern construction. Most masts were about half the length of the ship so that it did not project beyond the hull when unstepped.

There is a suggestion that the rig was sometimes used in a lateen style with the top cross spar dipped at an angle to aid sailing to windward i.e. the spar became the luff. There is little or no evidence to support this theory. No explanation is offered as to how this could be accomplished with a square sail as the lower reefed portion of the sail would be very bulky and would prevent even an approximation of the laminar flow necessary for windward sailing. There is no evidence of any triangular sails in use. Masts were held erect by side stays and possibly fore and aft stays. Each side stay was fitted at it lower end with a  toggle. There were no chain plates. The lower part of the side stay consisted of ropes looped under the end of a knee of upper futtock which had a hole underneath. About four turns of rope went between the angel and the toggle to give the mechanical advantage to tighten the side stays. At each turn the v-shape at the bottom of the angels "wings" jambed the stay preventing slippage and movement.

Rudder
Early long boats used some form of steering oar but by the tenth century the side rudder (called a steerboard, the source for the etymology for the word starboard itself) was well established. When the rudder was in its normal position the tiller was inserted in the upper hole so that the tiller faced athwartwise. The shaft was attached to the gunwale by a U shaped joint. This corresponded to a hole in the midsection of the rudder blade. From the outside the rope ran through the blade, through the round block and topsides and was fastened inside the hull. The flexibility of the hemp rope allowed the blade to pivot. When beached or in shallow water the tiller was moved to the lower hole, the blade rope was slackened and the rudder head pulled up so the rudder could operate in shallow waters. Modern facsimiles are reported to steer quite well but require a very large amount of physical effort compared to the modern fore and aft tiller.

Anchors
Longships for the most part used two different kinds of anchors. The most common was a natural wood yoke formed from a tree branch. The weight was supplied by a stone passing laterally through the U of the yoke. The top of the yoke was closed by either a length of hardwood or a curved iron head, which kept the stone in place. One side of the head stuck out so it could dig into mud or sand. In the Ladby ship burial in Denmark, a unique iron anchor has been found, resembling the modern fisherman's anchor but without the crossbar. The cross bar may have rusted away. This anchor—made of Norwegian iron—has a long iron chain to which the hemp warp was attached. This construction has several advantages when anchored in deep waters or in rough seas.

Ship builders' toolkit

At the height of Viking expansion into Dublin and Jorvik 875–954 AD the longship reached a peak of development such as the Gokstad ship 890. Archaeological discoveries from this period at Coppergate, in York, show the shipwright had a large range of sophisticated woodwork tools. Edged tools were kept sharp with sharpening stones from Norway. One of the most sophisticated tools was a  diameter twist drill bit, perfect for drilling holes for treenails. Simple mechanical pole wood lathes were used to make cups and bowls.

Replica longships

Since the discovery of the original longships in the 1800s, many boat builders have built Viking ship replicas. However, most have not been able to resist the temptation to use more modern techniques and tools in the construction process. In 1892–93, a full-size near-replica of the Gokstad ship, the Viking, was built by the Norwegian Magnus Andersen in Bergen. It was used to sail the Atlantic. It had a deeper keel with a  draught to stiffen the hull, a range of non-authentic triangular sails to help performance, and big fenders on each gunwale filled with reindeer hair to give extra buoyancy in case of swamping. A half-size replica of the Sutton Hoo longship has been equipped with a substantial sail, despite the original having oar power only. They took a year to make.

Navigation and propulsion

Navigation

During the Viking Age (900–1200 AD) Vikings were the dominant seafarers of the North Atlantic. One of the keys to their success was the ability to navigate skillfully across the open waters. The Vikings were experts in judging speed and wind direction, and in knowing the current and when to expect high and low tides. Viking navigational techniques are not well understood, but historians postulate that the Vikings probably had some sort of primitive astrolabe and used the stars to plot their course.

Viking Sundial

During an excavation of a Viking Age farm in southern Greenland part of a circular disk with carvings was recovered. The discovery of the so-called Viking Sundial suggested a hypothesis that it was used as a compass. Archaeologists found a piece of stone and a fragment of wooden disk both featuring straight and hyperbolic carvings. It turned out that the two items had been parts of sundials used by the Vikings as a compass during their sea-crossings along latitude 61 degrees North.

Archaeologists have found two devices which they interpret as navigation instruments. Both appear to be sundials with gnomon curves etched on a flat surface. The devices are small enough to be held flat in the hand at  diameter. A wooden version dated to about 1000 AD was found in Greenland. A stone version was also found at Vatnahverfi, Greenland. By looking at the place where the shadow from the rod falls on a carved curve, a navigator is able to sail along a line of latitude. Both gnomon curve devices show the curve for 61° north very prominently. This was the approximate latitude that the Vikings would have sailed along to get to Greenland from Scandinavia. The wooden device also has north marked and had 32 arrow heads around the edge that may be the points of a compass. Other lines are interpreted as the solstice and equinox curves. The device was tested successfully, as a sun compass, during a 1984 reenactment when a longship sailed across the North Atlantic. It was accurate to within ± 5°.

Hypothesis

The Danish archaeologist Thorkild Ramskou suggested in 1967 that the "sun-stones" referred to in some sagas might have been natural crystals capable of polarizing skylight. The mineral cordierite occurring in Norway has the local name "Viking's Compass." Its changes in colour would allow determining the sun's position (azimuth) even through an overcast or foggy horizon. The sunstones are doubly refracting, meaning that objects viewed through them can be seen as double because of positively charged calcium ions and negatively charged carbonate ions. When looking at the sun the stone, it will project two overlapping shadows on the crystal. The opacities of these shadows will vary depending on the sunstone's direction to the sun. When the two projected shapes have exactly the same opacity, it means the stone's long side is facing directly toward the sun. Since the stone uses light polarization, it works the best when the sun is at lower altitudes, or closer to the horizon. It makes sense that Norsemen were able to make use of sunstones, since much of the area they travelled and explored was near polar, where the sun is very close to the horizon for a good amount of the year. For example, in the Vinland sagas we see long voyages to North America, the majority sailed at over 61 degrees north.

An ingenious navigation method is detailed in Viking Navigation Using the Sunstone, Polarized Light and the Horizon Board by Leif K. Karlsen. To derive a course to steer relative to the sun direction, he uses a sun-stone (solarsteinn) made of Iceland spar (optical calcite or silfurberg), and a "horizon-board." The author constructed the latter from an Icelandic saga source, and describes an experiment performed to determine its accuracy. Karlsen also discusses why on North Atlantic trips the Vikings might have preferred to navigate by the sun rather than by stars, as at high latitudes in summer the days are long and the nights short.

A Viking named Stjerner Oddi compiled a chart showing the direction of sunrise and sunset, which enabled navigators to sail longships from place to place with ease. Almgren, an earlier Viking, told of another method: "All the measurements of angles were made with what was called a 'half wheel' (a kind of half sun-diameter which corresponds to about sixteen minutes of arc). This was something that was known to every skipper at that time, or to the long-voyage pilot or kendtmand ('man who knows the way') who sometimes went along on voyages ... When the sun was in the sky, it was not, therefore, difficult to find the four points of the compass, and determining latitude did not cause any problems either." (Almgrem)

Birds provided a helpful guide to finding land. A Viking legend states that Vikings used to take caged crows aboard ships and let them loose if they got lost. The crows would instinctively head for land, giving the sailors a course to steer.

Propulsion

The longships had two methods of propulsion: oars and sail. At sea, the sail enabled longships to travel faster than by oar and to cover long distances overseas with far less manual effort. Sails could be raised or lowered quickly. In a modern facsimile the mast can be lowered in 90 seconds. Oars were used when near the coast or in a river, to gain speed quickly, and when there was an adverse (or insufficient) wind. In combat, the variability of wind power made rowing the chief means of propulsion. The ship was steered by a vertical flat blade with a short round handle, at right angles, mounted over the starboard side of the aft gunwale.

Longships were not fitted with benches. When rowing, the crew sat on sea chests (chests containing their personal possessions) that would otherwise take up space. The chests were made the same size and were the perfect height for a Viking to sit on and row. Longships had hooks for oars to fit into, but smaller oars were also used, with crooks or bends to be used as oarlocks. If there were no holes then a loop of rope kept the oars in place.

An innovation that improved the sail's performance was the beitass, or stretching pole—a wooden spar stiffening the sail. The windward performance of the ship was poor by modern standards as there was no centreboard, deep keel or leeboard. To assist in tacking the beitass kept the luff taut. Bracing lines were attached to the luff and led through holes on the forward gunwale.

Legacy

The Vikings were major contributors to the shipbuilding technology of their day. Their shipbuilding methods spread through extensive contact with other cultures, and ships from the 11th and 12th centuries are known to borrow many of the longships' design features, despite the passing of many centuries.

Many historians, archaeologists and adventurers have reconstructed longships in an attempt to understand how they worked. These re-creators have been able to identify many of the advances that the Vikings implemented in order to make the longship a superior vessel.

The longship was a master of all trades. It was wide and stable, yet light, fast, and nimble. With all these qualities combined in one ship, the longship was unrivalled for centuries, until the arrival of the great cog.

In Scandinavia, the longship was the usual vessel for war even with the introduction of cogs in the 12th–13th centuries. Leidang fleet-levy laws remained in place for most of the Middle Ages, demanding that the freemen should build, man and furnish ships for war if demanded by the king—ships with at least 20 or 25 oar-pairs (40–50+ rowers). However, by the late 14th century, these low-boarded vessels were at a disadvantage against newer, taller vessels—when the Victual Brothers, in the employ of the Hansa, attacked Bergen in the autumn of 1393, the "great ships" of the pirates could not be boarded by the Norwegian levy ships called out by Margaret I of Denmark, and the raiders were able to sack the town with impunity. While earlier times had seen larger and taller longships in service, by this time the authorities had also gone over to other types of ships for warfare. The last Viking longship was defeated in 1429.

Notable longships

Preserved originals 
Several of the original longships built in the Viking Age have been excavated by archaeologists. A selection of vessels that has been particularly important to our understanding of the longships design and construction, comprise the following:

 The Nydam ship (c. 310–320 AD) is a burial ship from Denmark. No mast is attached, as it was a later addition to the longship design. The Nydam ship shows a combination of building styles and is important to our understanding of the evolution of the early Viking ships.
 "Puck 2" is the name given to a longship found in the Bay of Gdansk in Poland in 1977. It is peculiar and important because it was constructed by Western Slavic craftsmen, not Scandinavian. The design only differs very slightly from the Scandinavian built longships.
  is the name given to a longship found in the harbour of Hedeby in 1953. With a maximum width of just  it has a width-to-length ratio of more than 11, making it the slimmest longship ever discovered. It is made of oaken wood and its construction would have required a very high level of craftsmanship.
 The Oseberg ship and the Gokstad ship – both from Vestfold in Norway. They both represent the longship design of the later Viking Age.
It was discovered in 1996–97 at the Viking Ship Museum in Roskilde, Denmark. The ship was constructed around 1025.
 The Gjellestad ship, built in Norway around 732, was discovered in 2018. Excavations were completed in December 2022, and the remains of the keel are undergoing preservation.

Historical examples 
A selection of important longships known only from written sources includes:
 The Ormen Lange ("The Long Serpent") was the most famous longship of Norwegian king Olaf Tryggvason.
 The Mora was the ship given to William the Conqueror by his wife, Matilda, and used as the flagship in the Norman conquest of England. It is said to be of the drakar type.
 The Mariasuda, flagship of Norwegian king Sverre at the Battle of Fimreite, the largest recorded longship.

Replicas 
There are many replicas of Viking ships – including longships – in existence. Some are just inspired by the longship design in general, while others are intricate works of experimental archaeology, trying to replicate the originals as accurately as possible. Replicas important to our understanding of the original longships design and construction include:
 Viking, the very first Viking ship replica, was built by the Rødsverven shipyard in Sandefjord, Norway, modelled after the Gokstad ship. In 1893, it sailed across the Atlantic Ocean to Chicago in The United States for the World's Columbian Exposition.
 The Skuldelev replicas. All the five Skuldelev ships have been replicated, some of them several times. They are each of a different design and only Skuldelev 1, 2 and 5 are longships.
 The Sea Stallion is a replica of the Skuldelev 2 ship, constructed by authentic methods. At , it is the second longest Viking ship replica ever made. Skuldelev 2 was originally built near Dublin around 1042, and was rediscovered in Roskilde, Denmark in 1962. The Sea Stallion sailed from Roskilde to Dublin in summer 2007, to commemorate the voyage of the original. In the winter 2007–2008, The Sea Stallion was exhibited outside the National Museum in Dublin. In the summer of 2008, the Sea Stallion returned to Roskilde on a searoute south of England.
The ship is not a replica of any specific original longship, but was built by authentic construction methods. It was constructed in Haugesund, Norway and launched in 2012.
 The Íslendingur (Icelander) is a  replica of the Gokstad ship that was built using traditional building techniques. In 2000, it was sailed from Iceland to L'Anse aux Meadows in Newfoundland, to participate in the 1000 year anniversary of Leif Erikson's discovery of America.
 The Munin is a half-sized replica of the Gokstad ship. Berthed at the Vancouver Maritime Museum, she was built at the Scandinavian Community Centre, Burnaby, British Columbia and launched in 2001.
The Myklebust Ship is a 30 m replica of the original ship of the same name found in Nordfjordeid, Norway. The replica is situated in the Sagastad knowledge center, and is the largest longship ever discovered in Norway. The replica is the largest replica based on an original find. The replica was christened in 2019, as part of the opening of Sagastad.

See also
 Viking ships
 Medieval ships
 Birlinn
 Nordland
 Leidang
 Hugin

Notes

References

 Bill, Jan (1997). "Ships and seamanship", in Sawyer, P. (ed.), Oxford Illustrated History of the Vikings", Oxford: Oxford University Press.
 Bill, Jan (2008). "Viking Ships and the Sea", in Brink, S. and Price, N. (eds), The Viking World, Routledge, 2008, pp. 170–80. 
Hegedüs, R., Åkesson, S., Wehner, R., & Horváth, G. (2007). Could Vikings Have Navigated under Foggy and Cloudy Conditions by Skylight Polarization? On the Atmospheric Optical Prerequisites of Polarimetric Viking Navigation under Foggy and Cloudy Skies. Proceedings: Mathematical, Physical and Engineering Sciences, 463(2080), 1081–1095..
 Brøgger, A.W. and Shetelig, H. (1951). The Vikings Ships. Their Ancestry and Evolution, Oslo: Dreyer, 1951.
 Bruun, Per (1997). "The Viking Ship," Journal of Coastal Research, 4 (1997): 1282–89. JSTOR
 Durham, Keith (2002). Viking Longship, [New Vanguard 47], Osprey Publishing, 2002. 
 W. Fitzhugh and E. Ward, Vikings: The North Atlantic Saga. Washington: Smithsonian Institution Press. 2000.
 A. W. Brøgger (1951). The Viking ships, their ancestry and evolution, Oslo: Dreyer. 1951.
 Hale, J.R. (1998)."'The Viking Longship", Scientific American February 1998, pp. 58–66.
 K. McCone, 'Zisalpinisch-gallisch uenia und lokan' in Festschrift Untermann, ed Heidermans et al., Innsbruck, 1993.1.
 L. Trent (1999). The Viking Longship, San Diego: Lucent Books, 1999.
 A. Forte, R. Oram, and F. Pederson. Viking Empires. 1st. ed. Cambridge: Cambridge University Press, 2005 .
 D. Dersin, ed., What Life Was Like When Longships Sailed. first ed. Richmond: Time Life Books, 1998.
 D. Dersin, ed., What Life Was Like When Longships Sailed. 1st ed. Richmond: Time Life Books, 1998.
 Chartrand, Rene, Mark Harrison, Ian Heath, and Keith Durham. The Vikings: voyagers of discovery and plunder''. Osprey Publishing, 2006. 142–90.
Jesch, J. (2001). Ships and Sailing. In Ships and Men in the Late Viking Age: The Vocabulary of Runic Inscriptions and Skaldic Verse (pp. 119–179). 
N. A. M. Rodger. (1995). Cnut's Geld and the Size of Danish Ships. The English Historical Review, 110(436), 392–403. 
Per Bruun. (1997). The Viking Ship. Journal of Coastal Research, 13(4), 1282–1289.
Horváth, G., Barta, A., Pomozi, I., Suhai, B., Hegedüs, R., Åkesson, S., Wehner, R. (2011). On the trail of Vikings with polarized skylight: Experimental study of the atmospheric optical prerequisites allowing polarimetric navigation by Viking seafarers. Philosophical Transactions: Biological Sciences, 366 (1565), 772–782.
Bill, J. (2003). SCANDINAVIAN WARSHIPS AND NAVAL POWER IN THE THIRTEENTH AND FOURTEENTH CENTURIES. In Hattendorf J. & Unger R. (Eds.), War at Sea in the Middle Ages and the Renaissance (pp. 35–52). Boydell and Brewer.

External links 

 The Viking Ship Museum in Roskilde
 The Viking Ship Museum in Oslo
 The Ormen Friske disaster – a warning against construction errors in Viking ship replicas
 The Ormen Friske disaster in 1950 investigated
 Viking ships and traditional Norse wooden boats

Merchant sailing ship types
Naval sailing ship types
Viking ships
11th-century ships